Hallelujah All the Way Home is the debut album by New Zealand group, The Verlaines. First released in 1985 by Flying Nun Records, it was re-released by Homestead Records in 1989.

Track listing
All songs written by Graeme Downes.
"It Was Raining"
"All Laid On"
"The Lady and the Lizard"
"Don't Send me Away"
"Lying in State"
"Phil Too?"
"For the Love of Ash Grey"
"The Ballad of Harry Noryb"

Chart positions

Reception

1985 debut albums
The Verlaines albums
Homestead Records albums
Flying Nun Records albums